FC4 may refer to:

 Far Cry 4, a 2014 video game
 CFC4, Macmillan Pass Airport, Transport Canada's airport code
 Release 4 of the Fedora Core Linux distribution
  Fiber Channel protocol mapping layer
 FC4: an EEG electrode site according to the 10-20 system